Ben van der Burg (born 20 April 1968) is a retired speed skater from the Netherlands who was active between 1987 and 1992. He won a silver medal at the World All-Round Speed Skating Championships for Men in 1990. The same year he won three national titles, in the 1500 and 5000 m and allround.

Personal records

source:

Van der Burg has a score of 160.048 points on the Adelskalender

Tournament overview

 DNQ = Did not qualify for the final distance
 NC = No classification
 ** = Fell but finished
source:

Medals won

References

1968 births
Living people
Dutch male speed skaters
People from Midden-Delfland
World Allround Speed Skating Championships medalists
Sportspeople from South Holland
20th-century Dutch people
21st-century Dutch people